Christos Dogiamas was a Slavophone Greek chieftain in the Macedonian Struggle. He is also known by the nom de guerre Kapetan Itsos (καπετάν Ίτσος).

Biography 
Dogiamas was born in 1880 in Barovitsa (now Kastaneri) of Paionia, Kilkis.

At a young age, Dogiamas joined the Macedonian Struggle with his cousins, Traianos, Lazaros, Dimitrios, and Georgios Dogiamas. He became a co-leader of the Lazaros armed group and acted until 1907, mainly at Giannitsa Lake. Until the end of the Macedonian Struggle, Dogiamas was active in the regions of Paionia, Paiko, Almopia, and Gevgeli, confronting Bulgarian komitadjis and Ottoman soldiers as the leader of his own armed group. 

After the liberation of Macedonia and Greece's entry into World War I, Dogiamas set up an armed group with his cousin, chieftain Georgios Domiagias, to confront Bulgarian komitadjis, who had re-entered Macedonia. In 1916, their armed group battled a group of Bulgarian komitadjis. Christos Dogiamas and his cousin's brother-in-law, Georgios Kehagias, died after eliminating two komitadji armed groups.

Sources 
Οι Μακεδονομάχοι Αδελφοί Δογιάμα, Κωνσταντίνος Δογιάμας, publications University Studio Press, Εταιρεία Μακεδονικών Σπουδών, σσ. 6, 16
"Αφανείς, Γηγενείς Μακεδονομάχοι", επιστημονική επιμέλεια: Ιωάννης Σ. Κολιόπουλος, Εταιρεία Μακεδονικών Σπουδών, publications University Studio Press, 2008, p. 94
Βλαχόφωνοι Έλληνες, από το βιβλίο του Γεώργιου Μόδη: Ο Μακεδονικός Αγών και η νεώτερη μακεδονική ιστορία, εκδ. Β’ Εταιρείας Μακεδονικών Σπουδών, Θεσσαλονίκη 2007

Year of birth uncertain
1916 deaths
People killed in action
Greek people of the Macedonian Struggle
Greek Macedonians
Macedonian revolutionaries (Greek)
People from Goumenissa